Oued El Kheïr is a town and commune in Mostaganem Province, Algeria. It is located in Aïn Tédelès District. According to the 1998 census it has a population of 14,700.

References

Communes of Mostaganem Province